Norm Lortie (born December 25, 1938) was a Canadian politician. He served in the Legislative Assembly of British Columbia from 1991 to 1996, as a NDP member for the constituency of Delta North.

References

1938 births
Living people
British Columbia New Democratic Party MLAs
Politicians from Edmonton